Alcibiades Antonio Acosta Agudelo (June 14, 1965 in Soledad, Atlántico, Colombia) is a Colombian folk singer.

Biography
Acosta is the son of Alci Acosta.

Discography
1989 - Sencillamente
1990 - Camino Real
1992 - De Colombia
1993 - Con Sabor Y Sentimiento
1995 - Que Viva el Amor 
1996 - Esta de Moda
1997 - Herencia
1999 - Checomania
2000 - Checazos de Carnaval
2007 - 15 Anos De Exitos
2009 - El folclor de mi tierra
2013 - Checumbias

Awards
Nominated Latin Grammy Awards of 2007 - Best Cumbia/Vallenato Album: (Checazos De Carnaval 3)
Nominated Latin Grammy Awards of 2010 - Best Folk Album: (El Folclor de Mi Tierra)

External links

Official Website

1965 births
Colombian musicians
Living people